The Big Brother is a 1982 French crime drama film  written and directed by Francis Girod and starring Gérard Depardieu.

The film was entered into the main competition at the 39th edition of the Venice Film Festival. For her performance Souad Amidou was nominated for Most Promising Actress at the 1983 César Awards.

Plot

Cast 

 Gérard Depardieu as Gérard Berger / Bernard Vigo
 Souad Amidou as  Zina
  Hakim Ghanem as  Ali
 Jean Rochefort as  Charles-Henri Rossi
 Jacques Villeret  as Inspector Coleau
 Roger Planchon  as Inspector Valin
 Smaïn  as  Abdel
 Jean-Michel Ribes  as Client of Zina
  Corinne Dacla  as Gérard's lover 
  Christine Fersen as  Jane
  François Clavier as  Castel

References

External links

1982 crime drama films
1982 films
Films directed by Francis Girod
French crime drama films
1980s French-language films
1980s French films